Sheldi is a settlement in the former Gur i Zi municipality, Shkodër County, northern Albania. At the 2015 local government reform it became part of the municipality Shkodër.

References

Guri i Zi, Shkodër
Populated places in Shkodër
Villages in Shkodër County